The 2023 Road to the Kentucky Derby is a series of races through which horses qualified for the 2023 Kentucky Derby, which will be held on May 6. The field for the Derby is limited to 20 horses, with up to four 'also eligibles' in case of a late withdrawal from the field. There are three separate paths for horses to take to qualify for the Derby: the main Road consisting of races in North America (plus one in Dubai), the Japan Road consisting of four races in Japan, and the European road consisting of seven races in England, Ireland and France. The top four finishers in the specified races receive points, with higher points awarded in the major prep races in March and April. Earnings in non-restricted stakes races act as a tie breaker.

For 2023, the main Road to the Kentucky Derby resembled the 2022 Road to the Kentucky Derby, consisting of 37 races, one more event than in 2021, with 21 races for the Kentucky Derby Prep Season and 16 races for the Kentucky Derby Championship Season with the following changes:

 Points will now be awarded to the top-five finishing positions in qualifying races, and the significance of the G1 Breeders' Cup Juvenile and select races traditionally run in late January have been increased. Prep season races will now award points on a sliding scale of 10-4-3-2-1.

Points awarded in the Breeders' Cup Juvenile, will be increased from 20-8-4-2 to 30-12-9-6-3 in order to differentiate what has historically been a high-quality grade 1 race from others during the prep season.

Select prep season races that traditionally serve as steppingstones to the Kentucky Derby Championship Series have been elevated from 10-4-2-1 to 20-8-6-4-2. These include G3 Lecomte Stakes, G3 Southwest Stakes, G3 Withers Stakes, G3 Holy Bull Stakes, G3 Robert B. Lewis Stakes, G3 Sam F. Davis Stakes and the Listed John Battaglia Memorial Stakes.

Standings
The following table shows the points earned in the eligible races for the main series.

Prep season

Initial prep events
Note: 1st=10 points; 2nd=4 points; 3rd=3 points; 4th=2 points; 5th=1 point  (except the Breeders' Cup Juvenile: 1st=30 points; 2nd=12 points; 3rd=9 points; 4th=6 points; 5th=3 points)

The dates for most races shown below are based on the placement in the racing calendar from 2021/2022. Similarly, the purses shown below are based on the amounts from the previous year and will be updated when finalized.

Select prep events
Note: 1st=20 points; 2nd=8 points; 3rd=6 points; 4th=4 points; 5th=2 points

Championship series events

First leg of series 
Note: 1st=50 points; 2nd=20 points; 3rd=15 points; 4th=10 points; 5th=5 points

Second leg of series
These races are the major preps for the Kentucky Derby, and are thus weighted more heavily. Note: 1st=100 points; 2nd=40 points; 3rd=30 points; 4th=20 points; 5th=10 points

"Wild Card" events
Note: 1st=20 points; 2nd=8 points; 3rd=6 points; 4th=4 points; 5th=2 points

Japan Road to the Kentucky Derby 

The Japan Road to the Kentucky Derby is intended to provide a place in the Derby starting gate to the top finisher in the series. If the connections of that horse decline the invitation, their place is offered to the second-place finisher and so on through the top four finishers.

Note:
Cattleya Sho:  1st=10 points; 2nd=4 points; 3rd=3 points; 4th=2 points; 5th=1 point
Zen-Nippon Nisai Yushun:  1st=20 points; 2nd=8 points; 3rd=6 points; 4th=4 points; 5th=2 points
Hyacinth: 1st=30 points; 2nd=12 points; 3rd=9 points; 4th=6 points; 5th=3 points
Fukuyru : 1st=40 points; 2nd=16 points; 3rd=12 points; 4th=8 points; 5th=4 points

ƒ Filly

Qualification Table
The top four horses (colored brown within the standings) are eligible to participate in the Kentucky Derby provided the horse is nominated.

Notes:
 brown highlight – qualified
 grey highlight – did not qualify

European Road to the Kentucky Derby

The European Road to the Kentucky Derby is designed on a similar basis to the Japan Road and is intended to provide a place in the Derby starting gate to the top finisher in the series. If the connections of that horse decline the invitation, their place is offered to the second-place finisher and so on. If none of the top four accept, this place in the starting gate reverts to the horses on the main road to the Derby.

The series consists of seven races – four run on the turf in late 2022 when the horses are age two, plus three races run on a synthetic surface in early 2023.

Note:
 the four races in 2022 for two-year-olds: 1st=10 points; 2nd=4 points; 3rd=3 points; 4th=2 points; 5th=1 point
 the first two races in 2023: 1st=20 points; 2nd=8 points; 3rd=6 points; 4th=4 points; 5th=2 points
 The Cardinal Condition Stakes: 1st=30 points; 2nd=12 points; 3rd=9 points; 4th=6 points 5th=3 points

Qualification Table
The top four horses (colored brown within the standings) are eligible to participate in the Kentucky Derby provided the horse is nominated.

Notes:
 brown highlight – qualified
 grey highlight – did not qualify

Notes

References

Road to the Kentucky Derby, 2023
Road to the Kentucky Derby
Road to the Kentucky Derby
Road to the Kentucky Derby
Kentucky Derby